Luis Fernando López Erazo (born 3 June 1979 in San Juan de Pasto, Nariño) is a Colombian race walker.

López was introduced to athletics by his father, who was also a competitive race walker.  His uncle, Marcelino Pastrana, was a former Colombian national champion at the 800 m, and later became his coach.

When he won the gold medal at the 2011 World Championships, it was the first athletics world championship medal to be won by a Colombian.  He was declared the silver medalist in a photo finish at the 2017 Pan American Race Walking Cup 50 kilometers race walk, walking the same time as winner Claudio Villanueva, his personal best 3:51:35.

Personal bests

Track walk
10,000 m: 40:33.87 min –  Catania, 6 December 2003
20,000 m: 1:20:53.6 hrs (ht) –  Lima, 21 June 2009

Road walk
10 km: 38:10 min –  Beijing, 18 September 2010
20 km: 1:20:03 hrs –  Berlin, 15 August 2009
50 km: 3:51:35 hrs –  Lima, 14 May 2017

Achievements

References

External links

Tilastopaja biography

1979 births
Living people
Colombian male racewalkers
Athletes (track and field) at the 2003 Pan American Games
Athletes (track and field) at the 2004 Summer Olympics
Athletes (track and field) at the 2007 Pan American Games
Athletes (track and field) at the 2008 Summer Olympics
Athletes (track and field) at the 2011 Pan American Games
Athletes (track and field) at the 2012 Summer Olympics
Athletes (track and field) at the 2016 Summer Olympics
Olympic athletes of Colombia
World Athletics Championships medalists
World Athletics Championships athletes for Colombia
Pan American Games medalists in athletics (track and field)
Pan American Games bronze medalists for Colombia
Central American and Caribbean Games gold medalists for Colombia
Competitors at the 2006 Central American and Caribbean Games
Competitors at the 2010 Central American and Caribbean Games
World Athletics Championships winners
Central American and Caribbean Games medalists in athletics
Medalists at the 2011 Pan American Games
Sportspeople from Nariño Department
20th-century Colombian people
21st-century Colombian people